Peoria County is located in the U.S. state of Illinois. The 2020 United States Census listed its population at 181,830. Its county seat is Peoria. Peoria County is part of the Peoria, IL Metropolitan Statistical Area.

History

Peoria County was formed in 1825 out of Fulton County. It was named for the Peoria, an Illiniwek people who lived there. It included most of the western valley of the Illinois River up to the Chicago river portage.

Gallery timeline

Geography
The county is drained by Spoon River, Kickapoo Creek, Elbow Creek, and Copperas Creek.

Climate and weather

Adjacent counties

 Knox County – northwest
 Stark County – north
 Marshall County – northeast
 Woodford County – east
 Tazewell County – south
 Fulton County – southwest

Transportation

Transit
 Greater Peoria Mass Transit District
 List of intercity bus stops in Illinois

Major highways

  Interstate 74 in Illinois
  Interstate 474
  U.S. Route 24 in Illinois
  U.S. Route 150 in Illinois
  Illinois Route 6
  Illinois Route 8
  Illinois Route 9
  Illinois Route 29
  Illinois Route 40
  Illinois Route 78
  Illinois Route 90
  Illinois Route 91
  Illinois Route 116
 Illinois Route 336 (Soon)

Defunct highways
  Illinois Route 174
  Illinois Route 175

Airports
 General Wayne A. Downing Peoria International Airport (PIA), formerly Greater Peoria Regional Airport
 Mount Hawley Auxiliary Airport (3MY) – Peoria, Illinois

Demographics

As of the 2020 United States Census, there were 181,830 people, including 73,253 households.

The racial makeup of the county was 73.5% white alone, 18.8% black or African American alone, 4.1% Asian alone, 0.4% American Indian alone, .1% Native Hawaiian and Other Pacific Islander alone, 3.1% listed two or more races, 5.1% Hispanic or Latino, and 69.4% were white and not of Hispanic or Latino origin. In terms of ancestry, per the 2010 US Census, 28.3% were German, 14.8% were Irish, 10.4% were English, and 5.5% were American.

Of the 75,793 households, 30.5% had children under the age of 18 living with them, 44.1% were married couples living together, 14.1% had a female householder with no husband present, 37.7% were non-families, and 31.0% of all households were made up of individuals. The average household size was 2.39 and the average family size was 3.00. The median age was 36.8 years.

The median income for a household in the county was $49,747 and the median income for a family was $63,163. Males had a median income of $51,246 versus $32,881 for females. The per capita income for the county was $28,157. About 10.3% of families and 14.5% of the population were below the poverty line, including 21.8% of those under age 18 and 7.8% of those age 65 or over.

Points of interest
 Glasford crater
 Jubilee College State Park
 WMBD World's Most Beautiful Drive (Grandview Drive/Prospect)
 Forest Park Nature Center
 Peoria Heights Tower Park
 Rock Island Trail

Communities

Cities
 Chillicothe
 Elmwood
 Farmington (mostly in Fulton County)
 Pekin (mostly in Tazewell County)
 Peoria (seat)
 West Peoria

Villages

 Bartonville
 Bellevue
 Brimfield
 Dunlap
 Glasford
 Hanna City
 Kingston Mines
 Mapleton
 Norwood
 Peoria Heights (partly in Woodford County and Tazewell County)
 Princeville

Census-designated places
 Lake Camelot
 Mossville
 Rome
 Smithville
 Trivoli

Unincorporated communities

 Akron
 Alta
 Edelstein
 Eden
 Edwards
 Elmore
 Kickapoo
 Lake of the Woods
 Laura

Townships

 Akron
 Brimfield
 Chillicothe
 Elmwood
 Hallock
 Hollis
 Jubilee
 Kickapoo
 Limestone
 Logan
 Medina
 Millbrook
 Peoria City
 Princeville
 Radnor
 Richwoods
 Rosefield
 Timber
 Trivoli
 West Peoria

School districts

Notable residents

People from Peoria County other than in the city of Peoria:
 Chris Brackett, host of Arrow Affliction on The Sportsman Channel
 Mike Dunne, pitcher for several Major League Baseball teams
 Mary Emma Holmes (1839-1937), reformer, suffragist, and educator
 Bill Krieg, Major League Baseball player
 Lance (Henry) LeGault, TV and movie actor: Colonel Roderick Decker on The A-Team
 Zach McAllister, Major League Baseball player: Cleveland Indians pitcher
 Johnston McCulley, pulp fiction author: creator of Zorro
 Richard Pryor, Actor, Comedian
 David Ogden Stiers, actor, Major Charles Emerson Winchester III on M*A*S*H
 Josh Taylor, TV actor: Chris Kostichek on the soap opera Days of Our Lives
 Jim Thome, first baseman for several Major League Baseball teams

Government 
Peoria County is governed by an 18-member County Board which meets on the second Thursday of each month. Each member represents a district with roughly 10,000 residents.

The County also elects an Auditor, Circuit Clerk, Coroner, County Clerk, Sheriff, State's Attorney, Regional Superintendent (Education), and Treasurer to four-year terms.

Politics
Prior to 1992, Peoria County, like most of central Illinois, was powerfully Republican. Usually, it only voted for Democratic Party presidential candidates when they won nationally by a landslide. It began trending away from the GOP in the mid-1980s, as evidenced when Ronald Reagan only carried it with 55 percent of the vote in 1984 even as he was winning reelection in a landslide nationally.

From 1992 onward, the county has backed the Democratic candidate in every presidential election, though never by a margin greater than 10 percent aside from 2008 when Illinoisan Barack Obama won it by nearly 14 points. This relative closeness in results was most evident in 2004 when the county backed John Kerry over George W. Bush by only 70 votes.

In Congress, Peoria County is represented by Democrat Cheri Bustos of Illinois's 17th congressional district and Republican Darin LaHood of the Illinois's 18th congressional district.

In the Illinois Senate, Peoria County is represented by Republican Win Stoller of the 37th Legislative District and Democrat Dave Koehler of the 46th Legislative District. In the Illinois House of Representatives, Peoria County is represented by Republican Ryan Spain of the 73rd Representative District, Republican Mark Luft of the 91st Representative District and Democrat Jehan Gordon-Booth of the 92nd Representative District.

See also

 National Register of Historic Places listings in Peoria County, Illinois

References

External links

 
Illinois counties
Illinois placenames of Native American origin
1825 establishments in Illinois
Populated places established in 1825
Peoria metropolitan area, Illinois